Canadian recording artist Avril Lavigne has completed six concert tours beginning with the Try to Shut Me Up Tour in 2002–03. This was followed by the 13-month Bonez Tour in 2004–05 and The Best Damn World Tour in 2008. Her ongoing Love Sux Tour will complete in May 2023. The following is a chronological list of her concert tours.

Try to Shut Me Up Tour

The Try to Shut Me Up Tour was the debut concert tour by Canadian recording artist Avril Lavigne. Beginning in December 2002, the tour supported the singer's debut studio album, Let Go (2002). The trek played 70 dates in North America, Asia, Europe and Australia. The concert was chronicled on the video set My World. Filmed at the HSBC Arena in Buffalo, New York, the DVD features the full-length concert, music videos, a behind the scenes featurette and a live CD.

Setlist
"Sk8er Boi"
"Nobody's Fool"
"Mobile"
"Anything but Ordinary"
"Losing Grip"
"Naked"
"Too Much to Ask"
"I Don't Give"
"Basket Case"
"My World"
"I'm with You"
"Complicated"
"Unwanted"
"Tomorrow"
"Knockin' on Heaven's Door"
Encore
 "Things I'll Never Say"

Tour dates

Bonez Tour

The Bonez Tour is the second concert tour by Canadian recording artist, Avril Lavigne. In support of her second studio album Under My Skin (2004), the tour began in the fall of 2004. Playing over one hundred shows in Europe, the Americas, Australasia and Africa. The performances in 2004 ranked 97th on Pollstar's "Top Tours of 2004", earning over $5 million. The tour was recorded at the Nippon Budokan in Tokyo, Japan for the DVD set, Live at Budokan: Bonez Tour. The DVD featured the full concert with behind the scenes footage. The video was certified Gold in Japan.

Setlists 
{{hidden
| headercss = background: #ccccff; font-size: 100%; width: 65%;
| contentcss = text-align: left; font-size: 100%; width: 65%;
| header = Europe / North America (2004)
| content = 
"He Wasn't"
"My Happy Ending"
"Freak Out"
"Sk8er Boi"
"Losing Grip"
"Who Knows"
"Together"
"I'm with You"
"Forgotten"
"Mobile"
"Unwanted"
"Naked"
"Fall to Pieces"
"Nobody's Home" 
"Don't Tell Me"
Encore
"Song 2"
"Complicated"
"Slipped Away"
}}
{{hidden
| headercss = background: #ccccff; font-size: 100%; width: 65%;
| contentcss = text-align: left; font-size: 100%; width: 65%;
| header = Asia (2005)
| content =
"He Wasn't"
"My Happy Ending"
"Take Me Away"
"Freak Out"
"Sk8er Boi"
"Unwanted"
"Anything but Ordinary"
"Who Knows"
"I'm with You"
"Naked"
"Losing Grip"
"Together"
"Forgotten"
"Tomorrow"
"Fall to Pieces"
"Nobody's Home" 
"Don't Tell Me"
Encore
"Complicated"
"Slipped Away"

}}
{{hidden
| headercss = background: #ccccff; font-size: 100%; width: 65%;
| contentcss = text-align: left; font-size: 100%; width: 65%;
| header = Australia / Africa (2005)
| content =

"Losing Grip"
"Unwanted"
"My Happy Ending"
"Mobile"
"I Always Get What I Want"
"Things I'll Never Say"
"I'm with You"
"Who Knows"
"Don't Tell Me"
"Take Me Away"
"He Wasn't"
"American Idiot"
"Together"
"Forgotten"
"Tomorrow"
"Nobody's Home"
"Sk8er Boi"
Encore
"Song 2"
"Complicated"
Source:
}}
{{hidden
| headercss = background: #ccccff; font-size: 100%; width: 65%;
| contentcss = text-align: left; font-size: 100%; width: 65%;
| header = Europe / North America / South America (2005)
| content =

"Sk8er Boi"
"Unwanted"
"My Happy Ending"
"I Always Get What I Want"
"Mobile"
"I'm with You"
"Fall to Pieces"
"Don't Tell Me"
"Together"
"Forgotten"
"Tomorrow"
"Nobody's Home"
"Who Knows"
"Losing Grip"
"Take Me Away"
"He Wasn't"
Encore
"All the Small Things"
"Song 2"
"Complicated"
The setlist from the May 8, 2005 / Johannesburg (Coca-Cola Dome) show; not the setlist from very show on the tour leg. Source:
}}

Tour dates

The Best Damn World Tour

Black Star Tour

The Black Star Tour was the fourth concert tour by Canadian recording artist, Avril Lavigne. Visiting Asia, the Americas and Europe, promoting the singer's fourth studio album, Goodbye Lullaby (2011). Before the tour started, Lavigne said that she wanted the show to be intimate and personal, with guitars, piano and voice. She also said that wanted to play in small venues, to have a bigger contact with her fans.

Commercial performance
The tour was successful on tickets sales. A week after the Asian dates had been released, it was announced that 13,000 tickets were sold for Osaka, Japan. It also went really well in South America, where more than 55,000 tickets were sold, with price averaging $75-$120. All the tickets that went on sale for the first show in São Paulo were completely sold out on the same day. The concert held in Rio de Janeiro and Caracas had the higher grossings for the South American leg. In China, extra concerts were added for the second Asian leg, in Beijing and Guangzhou where Lavigne played for 10,000 fans at Guangzhou Gymnasium. On August 24, 2011 Lavigne ranked #15 position at Billboard boxscore due both shows in São Paulo, which grossed $980,009 combined. The tour has grossed $25 million dollars, with 61 concerts.

Setlists
{{hidden
| headercss = background: #ccccff; font-size: 100%; width: 65%;
| contentcss = text-align: left; font-size: 100%; width: 65%;
| header =South America
| content = 
"Black Star"
"What the Hell"
"Sk8er Boi"
"He Wasn't"
"I Always Get What I Want"
"Alice"
"Fix You"
"When You're Gone"
"Stop Standing There"
"Wish You Were Here"
"Nobody's Home"
"Girlfriend" 
"My Happy Ending" 
"Don't Tell Me"
"Smile"
"I'm with You
Encore
"Hot"
"Push"
"Complicated"

Source:
}}
{{hidden
| headercss = background: #ccccff; font-size: 100%; width: 65%;
| contentcss = text-align: left; font-size: 100%; width: 65%;
| header = Europe
| content = 
"Black Star"
"What the Hell"
"I Can Do Better"
"Sk8er Boi"
"He Wasn't"
"I Always Get What I Want"
"Alice"
"When You're Gone"
"Stop Standing There"
"Wish You Were Here"
"Girlfriend" 
"My Happy Ending" 
"Don't Tell Me"
"Smile"
"I'm with You"
"I Love You"
Encore
"Hot"
"Complicated"

Source:
}}
{{hidden
| headercss = background: #ccccff; font-size: 100%; width: 65%;
| contentcss = text-align: left; font-size: 100%; width: 65%;
| header = North America
| content = 
"Black Star"
"What the Hell"
"Sk8er Boi"
"He Wasn't"
"Don't Tell Me"
"I Always Get What I Want"
"Alice"
"When You're Gone"
"Wish You Were Here"
"Girlfriend" 
"Smile"
"My Happy Ending"
"I'm with You"
Encore
"Nobody's Home"
"Everybody Hurts"
"Complicated"
}}

Tour dates

The Avril Lavigne Tour

Head Above Water Tour

Love Sux Tour

The Love Sux Tour (originally titled Tour 2022 and the Bite Me Tour) is the seventh concert tour by Canadian recording artist, Avril Lavigne. The tour launched in support of her seventh studio album Love Sux (2022). It is currently scheduled to begin in Orillia, Canada, on April 30, 2022, and conclude in London, England, on May 10, 2023.

Background
Following her abbreviated tour in 2019, Lavigne announced shows in Europe, in October 2021. The dates were composed of canceled shows from 2020 and 2021, due to the pandemic. It was also reported shows in southeast Asia for May 2022, but those shows appear to be canceled. Following the release of the album's lead single, the singer revealed concerts in Canada, her first in a decade.

Alternative rap artists Mod Sun and Grandson will serve as the opening acts for these dates. 

One dollar from each concert ticket purchased will be donated to the Avril Lavigne Foundation. 

The tour was originally slated to start February 2022, but were rescheduled to the spring. European dates were postponed 2023, citing venue and travel restrictions, related to the ongoing pandemic. During the tour, Lavigne will also have performances at various music festivals including: Boston Calling, When We Were Young Rock in Rio the Firefly Music Festival and the iHeartRadio Music Festival.

Setlist
The following setlist was obtained from the concert held on May 10, 2022; at the Start.ca Performance Stage in London, Ontario. It does not represent all concerts for the duration of the tour. 

"Cannonball"
"Bite Me"
"What the Hell"
"Here's to Never Growing Up"
"Complicated"
"My Happy Ending"
"Smile"
"Losing Grip"
"Flames" 
"Love It When You Hate Me"
"Love Sux"
"Girlfriend"
"Bois Lie"
"Sk8er Boi"
Encore
 "Head Above Water"
"I'm with You"

Tour dates

Festivals and other miscellaneous performances
This concert is a part of the "Boston Calling Music Festival"
This concert is a part of "Rock in Rio"
This concert is a part of the "Firefly Music Festival"
This concert is a part of the "iHeartRadio Music Festival"
This concert is a part of "When We Were Young"

Cancellations and rescheduled shows

Footnotes

References

Concert tours
Lavigne, Avril